Nowellia wrightii is a species of liverwort in the family Cephaloziaceae. It is endemic to Cuba. Its natural habitat is subtropical or tropical moist lowland forests.

References

Cephaloziaceae
Flora of Cuba
Vulnerable plants
Endemic flora of Cuba
Taxonomy articles created by Polbot